Gastromega is a genus of moth in the family Lasiocampidae.

Species
Some species of this genus are:
Gastromega badia	 (Saalmüller, 1878)
Gastromega robusta		De Lajonquière, 1972
Gastromega sordida	 (Mabille, 1879)

References
Saalmüller, M. 1887. Lepidopteren von Madagascar. Erste Abtheilung. Rhopalocera, Heterocera: Sphinges et Bombyces. - — :1–246, pls. 1–6.

Lasiocampidae
Moth genera
Taxa named by Max Saalmüller